Gypsy is a 2020 Indian Tamil-language romantic road film written and directed by Raju Murugan. The film stars Jiiva, Natasha Singh, Lal Jose, and Sunny Wayne. This film marked the Tamil debut of actress Natasha Singh, director Lal Jose and actor Sunny Wayne. The film was produced by Ambeth Kumar under the banner of Olympia Movies. The film's soundtrack was composed by Santhosh Narayanan and cinematography and editing were handled by Selvakumar S. K. and Raymond Derrick Crasta, respectively.

After running into censorship troubles, the film was initially scheduled to release on 24 January 2020, but later pushed to 6 March 2020 release. The film had its theatrical release on 6 March 2020 after several delays and received mixed reviews from the critics mainly criticising the writing and screenplay. Critics revealed that the storyline and release of the film was a nick of time which resembled the 2020 Delhi riots.

Synopsis
A wandering musician and a girl from an orthodox Muslim household end up getting married, but the survival of their relationship becomes a big question following a communal riot in India.

Cast 
 Jeeva as Gypsy
John Jude Kennedy as Young Gypsy
 Natasha Singh as Waheeda
 Lal Jose as Muthaleef
 Sunny Wayne as Sakhavu Balan, a communist leader
 Yasmin Khan as Waheeda's mother
 Fajilama as Waheeda's younger sister
 Fahran as Waheeda' younger brother
 Susheela Raman as a Varanasi resident
 Karuna Prasad 
 Piyush Manush
 Bant Singh

Production 
The film titled was announced by director Raju Murugan as his third assignment in June 2018 who is also known for his previous directorial works such as Joker and Cuckoo. The shooting for the film commenced in around early June 2018 at Karaikkal. The first look poster of the film was unveiled on 11 June 2018. Jiiva accepted to work for the film with the director while he was busy with the shooting of his next film Gorilla.

The film was initially speculated to be a social drama film but later the film-makers revealed that the film was made up as a romantic travel based story. Malayalam actor Sunny Wayne was roped in to play an important role as communist leader in the film and coincidentally he made his début in Kollywood industry through this film.

For his role in the film, Jiiva grew his hair, learned to play the guitar, and practiced horseriding. The shooting of the film was wrapped up on 6 November 2018.

Marketing 
The makers announced that the satellite and digital rights of Gypsy have been acquired by Zee Tamil.

Soundtrack 

Raju Murugan, decided to recruit Santhosh Narayanan, to compose the soundtrack and score for the film, after the latter's debut film Cuckoo in which the former was impressed by Santhosh's composition of songs and score in the film. The song recording process, was completed within the end of 2018. All the lyrics for the songs were written by Yugabharathi, except one song was written and performed by Arivu. The album features six tracks. In an interview with The Hindu, Santhosh Narayanan said that Jiiva's guitar in the film is special. As a story of a travelling musician, Gypsy is a particularly appealing film for a music director. “It’s a very fun project as a composer to work on a movie that has music in its core.” They also custom-made a guitar from Kashmir for Jiiva to use in the film.

The song teaser of the film was unveiled on 31 December 2018. The first single "Very Very Bad" which featured in the film was released on 22 January 2019 with the auspices of Indian Communist Party members and social activists such as R. Nallakannu, Thirumurugan Gandhi, Piyush Manush, Balbharati and Grace Banu. This marks the first ever instance in Tamil cinema that social activists were invited to launch a Tamil film's song promo. The second single track "Desaandhiri" which was sung by Santhosh Narayanan, with backing vocals by actor Siddharth was launched on 26 February 2019. Carnatic musician T. M. Krishna had recorded the song "Venpura" for the film.

The complete soundtrack album in its entirety was released on 3 April 2019, at Sathyam Cinemas, Chennai. Featuring director Karu Palaniappan, composers D. Imman, Sean Roldan, producer S. R. Prabhu and other celebrities along with the film's cast and crew in attendance, the event also featured Bant Singh, an activist singer. A book on Bant Singh, who has done a role in the film, was launched at the event as a gesture of his personal rebellion against discrimination. The film's trailer was launched at the event. British-Indian musician Susheela Raman who also played a supporting role in the film, performed two songs which were released as bonus singles, after the soundtrack release on 19 May 2019.

Track listing

Critical reception 

Moviecrow rated the album 4 out of 5 stars, with a bottom line "Gypsy, Rajumurugan's third directorial is again up with an exquisitely ensembled soundtrack of Santhosh Narayanan. The amazing blend of indieness, extreme genres, poetry, politics, rap, folk, love and hope in every track holds a huge sign of positive light for the film!"

StudioFlicks rated the movie 3.25 out of 5 stars, with a bottom line "Very well written story, strong characters, beautiful music and top-notch performances makes ‘Gypsy’ a laudable flick."

Censorship issues 
The film faced issues on censoring, despite wrapping the shoot months ago. The Central Board of Film Certification (CBFC), disapproved to censor the film as there are some scenes in the film that resemble the issues that happened in the Yogi Adityanath government in Uttar Pradesh, and there are also reports that some dialogues have been asked to be muted and names of characters which resemble real-life prominent figures have been asked to be changed, in the hope of avoiding a controversy later on. The censor issues were cleared after the makers appealed the Film Certification Appeal Tribunal (FCAT), regarding the issue, where the film received an "A" certificate with minor cuts. Actor Jiiva revealed that  25 cuts of the film are available in YouTube.

Release 
The film was initially scheduled to release on 24 January 2020, but director Murugan announced that the film would release on 6 March 2020.

References

External links 
 

2020 films
2020s Tamil-language films
Indian romantic drama films
Films scored by Santhosh Narayanan
Indian drama road movies
Censored films
2020s drama road movies
2020 romantic drama films
Films directed by Raju Murugan